Holops is a genus of small-headed flies in the family Acroceridae. It is endemic to Chile.

Species
The genus includes six species:
 Holops anarayae Barahona-Segovia, 2021
 Holops cyaneus Philippi, 1865
 Holops frauenfeldii Schiner, 1868
 Holops grezi Barahona-Segovia, 2021
 Holops pullomen Barahona-Segovia, 2021
 Holops virens Bigot, 1878

References

Acroceridae
Diptera of South America
Taxa named by Rodolfo Amando Philippi
Arthropods of Chile
Endemic fauna of Chile